Crudia zeylanica, sometimes known as Sri Lanka legume, is a species of plant in the family Fabaceae endemic to Sri Lanka. Once thought to be extinct, the plant was rediscovered in 2019.

Rediscovery
Until 2019, this tree had not been seen since 1911, and was known only from the herbarium specimens. Thus, it was listed as extinct by an outdated IUCN Red List assessment. In 2019, the plant was rediscovered in a small plot of forest land located close to the Daraluwa Railway Station in Gampaha in several places in Gampaha District.

Conservation effort
On 7 February 2021, Gampaha Divisional Forest Officer Devani Jayathilaka visited a construction site of the expressway from Kadawatha to Meerigama and discovered a Crudia zeylanica plant. She immediately prevented the workers from destroying it and informed the personnel regarding the matter. The news made a huge media circus in Sri Lanka, where several authorities cited the value of the tree and prevented it from being cut. 

On 10 February 2021, the plant was ordained by the Buddhist clergy from the National Bhikku Front in an effort to protect it.

References

zeylanica
Endemic flora of Sri Lanka
Taxonomy articles created by Polbot